Balticeras is an involute, discoidal Upper Jurassic (Oxfordian) ammonite (order Ammonitida) found in England, Germany, and Switzerland, belonging  to the Perisphinctidae. The shell is strongly embracing, tending to be oxyconic (sharp rimmed). Sides are gently curved, converging on a narrow to sharp ventral rim.

Balticeras is considered by some to be a subgenus of Ringsteadia which in contrast is more evolute, with ribbed inner whorls. Both are included in the Pictoniinae, a subfamily established by Spath, 1924, for large ammonites within the Perisphinctidae, tending to develop smooth middle and outer whorls.

References
Notes

Bibliography
Arkell, et al., 1957. Mesozoic Ammonoidea; Treatise on Invertebrate Paleontology, Part L (Ammonoidea). Geol. Soc. of America and Univ. Kansas Press.

Jurassic ammonites
Ammonites of Europe
Oxfordian life
Ammonitida genera
Perisphinctidae